This is a list of notable footballers who have played for FC Girondins de Bordeaux. Generally, this means players that have appeared in 100 or more first-class (league, Coupe de France, Coupe de la Ligue and European) matches for the club. However, some who played fewer matches are also included;those who fell short of 100 appearances but made significant contributions to the history of the club. For a full list of all Bordeaux players with Wikipedia articles (major or otherwise) see :Category:FC Girondins de Bordeaux players.

Players are listed according to the date of their first professional contract signed with the club. Those whose nationality contains a link to their country's team (in blue) won full international caps, either whilst at Bordeaux or elsewhere. Appearances and goals are for competitive first-team matches only. Substitute appearances included.

List of players

References

 
Association football player non-biographical articles
Bordeaux